= Rubus blanchardianus =

Scientific classification
- Kingdom: Plantae
- Clade: Embryophytes
- Clade: Tracheophytes
- Clade: Angiosperms
- Clade: Eudicots
- Clade: Rosids
- Order: Rosales
- Family: Rosaceae
- Genus: Rubus
- Species: R. blanchardianus

Binomial name
- Rubus blanchardianus (L.H. Bailey) L.H. Bailey 1941

Synonyms
- Rubus hispidus var. blanchardianus L.H. Bailey 1923; Rubus jacens var. blanchardianus (L.H. Bailey) L.H. Bailey 1925

Berry and plant

Rubus blanchardianus (Blanchard's dewberry) is a rare North American species of flowering plant in the rose family. It has been found only in the State of Vermont in the northeastern United States.

The genetics of Rubus is extremely complex, so that it is difficult to decide on which groups should be recognized as species. There are many rare species with limited ranges such as this. Further study is suggested to clarify the taxonomy.
